Transcend is an advocacy and support group, and a registered charity founded in 2012 by actor and advocate Rebekah Robertson, in support of transgender young people.

History
Transcend was the first parent-led support group and information hub in Australia for gender diverse children and their parents. As an information hub, the website provides information about where to find support and information specific to the reader's location, details on how to access treatment and how to look after a gender diverse child (for parents) as well as specific support services for the child themselves. Furthermore, the website also lists contact details for different services and specialists nationwide. The 'latest news' section contains various links to articles or media pieces that relate to trans issues or to Robertson and her daughter Georgie's advocacy. The blog is still accessible and online.

In 2014, Transcend began raising money for the Royal Children's Hospital Gender Service, a service that provides help for transgender children and support for families. Since July 2017, over $30,000 has been raised. Since their appearance on Four Corners, Transcend began to focus more on advocacy and law reform surrounding access to stage-two treatment, as opposed to being a support group. Robertson was nominated for Straight Ally of the Year at the GLOBE Community Awards in 2016,  but lost to Matt Finnis from St Kilda Football Club.

Awards and nominations

See also
 Transgender rights in Australia

References

External links
 

LGBT rights in Australia
Transgender rights
Transgender organizations